The Scarlet Lady is a 1922 British silent sports drama film directed by Walter West and starring Violet Hopson, Louis Willoughby and Cameron Carr.

Cast
 Violet Hopson as Gwendoline Gordon  
 Louis Willoughby as Martin Strong  
 Cameron Carr as Henry Wingate  
 Arthur Walcott as Mark Worth  
 Adeline Hayden Coffin as Aunt Priscilla

References

Bibliography
 Low, Rachael. The History of the British Film 1918-1929. George Allen & Unwin, 1971.

External links
 

1922 films
1920s sports drama films
British sports drama films
British silent feature films
Films directed by Walter West
Films set in England
British horse racing films
British black-and-white films
1922 drama films
1920s English-language films
1920s British films
Silent sports drama films